Fumihiko Machida (born 17 March 1969) is a Japanese badminton player. He competed at the 1992 Summer Olympics and the 1996 Summer Olympics.

References

1969 births
Living people
Japanese male badminton players
Olympic badminton players of Japan
Badminton players at the 1992 Summer Olympics
Badminton players at the 1996 Summer Olympics
Place of birth missing (living people)
20th-century Japanese people